Spinomantis is a frog genus in the mantellid subfamily Mantellinae. This genus is restricted to Madagascar. At present it contains 13 species. They are arboreal or terrestrial frogs and occur in or along small streams. Most species are nocturnal.

Taxonomy
The genus Spinomantis was erected as a subgenus of Mantidactylus by Dubois in 1992. It was elevated to genus-level in 2006.

Description
The toes have rudimentary to moderate webbing. The finger tips are distinctly enlarged. Males have subgular vocal sacs.

Species
There are 14 species:

References

 
Mantellidae
Amphibian genera
Endemic frogs of Madagascar